Pandanus latiloculatus is a species of plant in the Pandanaceae family.

Distribution 
It is endemic to Cameroon.

Description 
Pandanus latiloculatus (screwpine) are large candelabra shaped trees, which grow to 15-20 meters tall. They are prevalent in swamp or wetland forest.

Taxonomy 
It was named by Kim-Lang Huynh in Botanica Helvetica 101(1): 248, in  1991.

References 

latioculatus